The Nu Breed Music Group, commonly referred to as The Nu Breed Recording or just The Nu Breed, is a United States based hip-hop record label, owned by Anthony "Fate" Lynch.

Company history 
The Nu Breed was founded by Anthony "Fate" Lynch during his first year at college. Keith "Tryfle" Hudson joined Fate shortly after when they were introduced to each other during a showcase performance. Hudson later signed on as the first Nu Breed Artist in 2004. The first release on the Nu Breed Music Group was Tryfle,' “Better Than You,” in 2004. The first full-length album released by the Nu Breed Music Group was Tryfle's "12/6/84" in December 2004. The following year The Nu Breed Roster increased by signing long-time friends Liam "Mozaliam" Taylor and Luis "Bux" Bodre. Since then The Nu Breed has signed high-profile acts Rob Frank, J.Columbo, 642 and I-Z.

In 2007, the Nu Breed Music Group Were Semi finalists in the disc makers Independent Music World Music Series. That year they were also featured on hiphopglobal.com. In January 2008, the Nu Breed was the first act featured on Ifyoulove.net. A music related website that showcases the talents emerging on the scene. In late 2008, the Nu Breed Music Group signed Harlem Entertainment Mogul Jayson "J-Didda" Butler and his Crezyrakk Records Imprint to a joint venture.

A Nu Breed compilation album titled The Nu Breed: Chapter 1, which showcases the talents of all the Nu Breed artists was planned for release in 2010. The Nu Breed Music Group created a website that keeps up to date with what is going on in the group.

Discography
 2004: Tryfle: 12/6/84
 2005: Tryfle: Problem Child
 2006: The Nu Breed: Problem Child 2.5: The Nu Breed Remix

The Nu Breed artists 

 Tryfle
 Anthony "Fate" Lynch
 J-Didda a.k.a. The Bishop of Harlem
 Ultimate Bux
 Mozaliam
 642
 J.Columbo
 I-Z
 Chief Major
 Rob Frank

Awards 
 Garageband Awards
 Track of the Day on 9Mar2008 in Hip Hop
 Best Programming in Hip Hop, week of 24Mar2008
 Best Production in Hip Hop, week of 3Mar2008
 Best Melody in Hip Hop, week of 25Feb2008
 Best Melody in Hip Hop, week of 3Mar2008
 Best Melody in Hip Hop, week of 24Mar2008
 Best Mood in Hip Hop, week of 25Feb2008
 Best Mood in Hip Hop, week of 3Mar2008
 Best Mood in Hip Hop, week of 24Mar2008

References

External links 
 Official site
  spotlight article
  Hip Hop Global Article
 Garageband Award Page

American record labels
Hip hop record labels
Contemporary R&B record labels